Haddon Mason (21 February 1898 – 30 April 1966) was a British film actor.

Selected filmography
 Every Mother's Son (1926)
 Dawn (1928)
 The Triumph of the Scarlet Pimpernel (1928)
 The Lady of the Lake (1928)
 The Woman in White (1929)
 A Peep Behind the Scenes (1929)
 Painted Pictures (1930)
 London Melody (1930)
 French Leave (1930)
 Inquest (1931)
 The Shadow Between (1931)
 Castle Sinister (1932)
 The Village Squire (1935)
 Contraband (1940)

References

External links
 

1898 births
1966 deaths
English male film actors
Male actors from London
20th-century English male actors